Prophetstown is a city in Whiteside County, Illinois, United States. The population was 2,080 at the 2010 census, up from 2,023 in 2000.

Geography
Prophetstown is located at  (41.670504, -89.935869).

History

An 1825 treaty establishes an unnamed "Winnebago village" about 40 miles above the mouth of the Rock River as a boundary point of the Winnebago, corresponding to the location of Prophetstown.

Prophetstown occupies the site of the village of the Winnebago prophet, which the Illinois volunteers destroyed on May 10, 1832, in the first act of hostility in the Black Hawk War. Prophetstown was named for Wabokieshiek (White Cloud), the prophet who lived upon the land. Wabokieshiek served as an advisor to Black Hawk and took part in the Black Hawk War. Wabokieshiek and his followers, the Sauk Indians, resided where the current Prophetstown State Park (of Illinois) is now located. They left the land in 1832 as the Black Hawk War ended, when Wabokieshiek was taken captive by the United States. This area is now a state park, but at one time it held a community of 14 villages.

It is believed that residents of Prophetstown petitioned to move the U.S. government from Washington D.C. to Prophetstown in the 1800s because of its supposed central location of the lower 48 states.

Prophetstown once held community events such as Cruise Night and showcased many classic cars. Eventually that event faded and Eclipse Park was replaced with a memorial to honor those who served in the Armed Forces. Prophetstown is still held in high esteem for having one of the largest Fourth of July fireworks shows in the area.  Prophetstown also hosts a Lighted Christmas Parade as the highlight of the start of the holiday season the Saturday before Thanksgiving.  Prophetstown is an Illinois Main Street Community. The downtown features a series of historical murals and Eclipse Square Park as well as a selection of stores and restaurants.

Demographics

As of the census of 2000, there were 2,023 people, 809 households, and 533 families residing in the city. The racial makeup of the city was 97.92% White, 0.89% African American, 0.10% Native American, 0.10% Asian, 0.25% from other races, and 0.74% from two or more races. Hispanic or Latino people of any race were 1.14% of the population.

There were 809 households, out of which 25.5% had children under the age of 18 living with them, 56.1% were married couples living together, 7.4% had a female householder with no husband present, and 34.0% were non-families. 31.6% of all households were made up of individuals, and 17.8% had someone living alone who was 65 years of age or older. The average household size was 2.31 and the average family size was 2.89.

In the city, the population was spread out, with 21.4% under the age of 18, 7.2% from 18 to 24, 25.2% from 25 to 44, 23.3% from 45 to 64, and 23.0% who were 65 years of age or older. The median age was 43 years. For every 100 females, there were 93.4 males. For every 100 females age 18 and over, there were 88.3 males.

The median income for a household in the city was $37,452, and the median income for a family was $47,589. Males had a median income of $33,828 versus $21,438 for females. The per capita income for the city was $19,572. About 3.9% of families and 9.5% of the population were below the poverty line, including 8.4% of those under age 18 and 4.0% of those age 65 or over.

Notable people
 Bret Bielema (1970–), head football coach for the University of Illinois
 George S. Brydia (1887–1970), journalist, salesman, and politician; served as mayor of Prophetstown
 Claude A. Fuller, former third district congressman from Arkansas; born in Prophetstown in 1885
 Paul E. Rink (1916–2000), Illinois state legislator and judge; born on a farm near Prophetstown

See also

 List of cities in Illinois

References

External links

 Prophetstown Main Street

Cities in Whiteside County, Illinois
Cities in Illinois
Sac and Fox